Rebecca Caroline Thompson is an American physicist, popular science writer, and head of the Office of Education and Public Outreach at Fermilab. Her first book, Fire, Ice, and Physics, explores the science of Game of Thrones, and was published by MIT Press in 2019. She was elected Fellow of the American Physical Society in 2016.

Early life and education 
Thompson was born in Chicago and raised near Annapolis, Maryland. Her father was a physicist and her mother a high school principal. Thompson was encouraged by one of her friends to take a class in physics, and enjoyed it so much she decided to study it at university. She was the youngest person in Delaware to get her skydiving license.

Thompson majored in physics at Bryn Mawr College. She moved to the University of Texas at Austin for her graduate studies, where she studied pattern formation in buckled membranes using computational modeling. She worked under the supervision of Michael Marder in the Centre for Nonlinear Dynamics. Specifically, she looked at the morphology of nano-flowers that form at the tip of silicon nanowires as well as the formation of ripples in sheets of graphene. The silicon nanowire tips form nano-flowers when in the presence of different gases. In the nano-flower formation process, the nanowires extend, and intricate patterns of silicon oxide start to form. She has shown that the nanowires extend more in the presence of gold, and that nano-flowers only form in the presence of oxygen. She reported that ripples in graphene sheets can be understood by considering the adsorption of hydroxide molecules in random sites across the graphene layers. The process of adsorbing hydroxide causes the carbon – carbon bonds to extend, which can result in static buckling. During her graduate studies, she became more interested in teaching and doing physics outreach.

Career 
In 2008, Thompson joined the American Physical Society as Head of Public Outreach. At APS, Thompson created the comic series Spectra: The Original Laser Superhero. The series, illustrated by Kerry G. Johnson and published by Physics Central, followed a middle school student (Lucy Hene) with laser-related superpowers. These included being able to pass through transparent surfaces, change colors depending on her levels of energy and play compact discs. The comic book was popular amongst physicist and comic book readers, and was part of the annual comic book convention San Diego Comi-Con'.

Thompson was elected Fellow of the American Physical Society in 2016. Thompson is a fan of Game of Thrones, and wrote Fire, Ice, and Physics, the Science of Game of Thrones for MIT Press in 2019. In 2019 Thompson joined Fermilab as Head of the Office of Education and Public Outreach.

Selected publications

References 

Year of birth missing (living people)
Living people
American physicists
American women physicists
Bryn Mawr College alumni
University of Texas at Austin alumni
People associated with Fermilab
Fellows of the American Physical Society
21st-century American women